Secretary General of Interpol is the chief administrative officer and the highest official of the Interpol. It conducts administrative tasks at the General Secretariat and is responsible for the implementation of the decisions made by the General Assembly and executive committee.

The post of Interpol's secretary general is proposed by the executive committee while the General Assembly is responsible for the appointment. It is generally appointed for a term of five years and may be re-appointed only once. Its role is principally regulated by the Articles 28–30. A secretary general is also responsible for policymaking under the General Secretariat's framework. It coordinates with the member states chiefs working in concerned department and organisations.

History 
Secretary general was created in 1932 under the Article 5. Prior its inception, the organisation was headed by a secretary than a secretary general. Oskar Dressler became the first secretary of the Interpol and he was later appointed as secretary general after the post was created in 1932. Dressler served as a secretary general of the organisation from 1932 to 1946.

List of officeholders 
Secretaries general since organization's inception in 1923.

See also 
 Secretary-General of the United Nations
 Secretary General of the Organisation of Islamic Cooperation
 Secretary General of the Organization of American States
 President of Interpol

Notes

References

Further reading 
 

Interpol officials
Secretaries-general